A Cinderella Story: Starstruck is a 2021 American teen comedy musical film written and directed by Michelle Johnston and starring Bailee Madison and Michael Evans Behling. It is a standalone sequel to A Cinderella Story: Christmas Wish (2019), and the sixth installment of A Cinderella Story film series. The film was released digitally on June 29, 2021, and on DVD on July 13, 2021.

Cast
 Bailee Madison as Finley Tremaine
 Michael Evans Behling as Jackson Stone
 April Telek as Valerian
 Lillian Doucet-Roche as Saffron
 Richard Harmon as Kale

Production
The film was shot in Vancouver, Canada on the Kent Farm in 2020, during the COVID-19 pandemic.

Release 
A Cinderella Story: Starstruck was released on digitally on June 29, 2021, and on DVD on July 13, 2021.

References

External links
 

A Cinderella Story (film series)
2021 comedy films
2021 direct-to-video films
2020s musical comedy films
2020s teen comedy films
American direct-to-video films
American musical comedy films
American sequel films
American teen comedy films
American teen musical films
Direct-to-video comedy films
Direct-to-video sequel films
Films based on Charles Perrault's Cinderella
Films directed by Michelle Johnston
Films scored by Jake Monaco
Films impacted by the COVID-19 pandemic
Films shot in Vancouver
Warner Bros. direct-to-video films
Films based on Cinderella
2020s English-language films
2020s American films